Jacques André (25 February 1919 – 2 April 1988) was a French fighter pilot in the Normandie-Niemen Regiment, which flew on the Eastern Front of World War II. He was one of four french citizens awarded the title Hero of the Soviet Union.

After World War II he competed in the men's 400 metres hurdles at the 1948 Summer Olympics.

References

External links
 

1919 births
1988 deaths
French World War II flying aces
Foreign Heroes of the Soviet Union
Recipients of the Order of Lenin
Recipients of the Order of the Red Banner
Recipients of the Croix de Guerre 1939–1945 (France)
Chevaliers of the Légion d'honneur
Athletes (track and field) at the 1948 Summer Olympics
French male hurdlers
Olympic athletes of France
20th-century French people